Konstskolan Idun Lovén (Idun Lovén Art School, or Idun Lovén for short) is a preparative art school in Stockholm, Sweden. The school is named after sculptor and former headmaster Idun Lovén.

Education 
Idun Lovén consists of two departments; sculpture and painting. Each of these hosts about 22 students divided into two year groups. The maximum time to study at Idun Lovén is two years (as of 2008).

Studies consists of equal parts model painting/sculpting and projects. During the projects students are working in groups or individually with realizing a more demanding task they have put up themselves.

History

Headmasters 
 1920: The school is founded by painter Edward Berggren and sculptor Gottfrid Larsson.
 1958: School taken over by sculptor Idun Lovén.
 1988: Painter Börje Svensson becomes headmaster.
 2002: Sculpress Gunilla Wihlborg becomes headmaster.

Locations 
 -2005: Building Skeppet, Värtahamnen.
 2005-: Minuthandlarvägen 2, Årsta partihallar, Årsta. Old advertising office of ICA.

Funding 
The schools receives government funding but also collects a fee (7500 SEK/term as of 2009) from the students.

Teachers

Sculpting 
 Gunilla Wihlborg
 Irène Westman
 Erik Åkerlund
 John Stenborg

Painting 
 Daniel Jensen
 Irina Gebuhr
 Henrik Samuelsson (on leave as of 2008)
 Erik Jeor

Theory 
 Susanna Slöör (-2008)
 Per Hasselberg (2008-)

Prominent former students 
Prominent Swedish artists who have studied at Konstskolan Idun Lovén includes:
 Linn Fernström
 Carl Hammoud

Art schools in Sweden